Stepan Hirskyi (born 8 January 1991) is a professional Ukrainian football defender who currently plays for club Stal Stalowa Wola in the II liga (Poland).

Hirskyi is the product of the Karpaty Lviv Youth School System. He made his debut for FC Karpaty entering as a second-half substitute against FC Metalurh Donetsk on 15 May 2011 in Ukrainian Premier League.

He also played for Ukrainian national football teams in different age representations.

References

External links
 
 

1991 births
Living people
Ukrainian footballers
FC Karpaty Lviv players
FC Karpaty-2 Lviv players
FC Nyva Ternopil players
FC Poltava players
Ukrainian Premier League players
Ukrainian expatriate footballers
Expatriate footballers in Poland
Chrobry Głogów players
GKS Tychy players
Association football defenders
Sportspeople from Lviv